Appleford railway station serves the village of Appleford-on-Thames in Oxfordshire, England, as well as nearby settlements such as Sutton Courtenay. The station and all trains serving it are operated by Great Western Railway.

Layout
The station entrance is on a humpback bridge and passengers must descend steep steps to the platforms.

Platform 1 is for Down trains towards , and Platform 2 is for Up trains towards Didcot Parkway.
South of the station is a pedestrian level crossing; the barrier is normally lowered with lights off. The user has to press a button for the signaller to raise the barriers; then they are lowered again once the user is clear of the crossing. The lights are only used to warn people that the barriers are coming down.

History

The station opened originally with the line from Didcot to Oxford, on 12 June 1844. It had been planned and partly built by the Oxford Railway, which was absorbed into the Great Western Railway before the opening of the line. It was however closed after just a few years in February 1849.

The Great Western Railway reopened the station as "Appleford Halt" on 11 September 1933 in response to growing competition from buses.

The station then passed to the Western Region of British Railways on nationalisation in 1948.

British Rail discontinued its "Halt" suffix on 5 May 1969. The station was served by Network SouthEast when sectorisation was introduced in the 1980s.

Unusually, until recently it retained the original wooden platforms and corrugated iron pagoda-roofed waiting shelters. These have been replaced by "bus shelter"-like waiting shelters. The station has never been staffed; originally passengers could buy tickets at the village post office, but since this has closed, they need to buy tickets from the on-train conductor.

Services
In total there are 12 services each way with a two-hourly interval between trains, but shorter intervals at peak times. Most services continue beyond Oxford towards Banbury.

Notes

References
 
 
 Station on navigable O.S. map.

Railway stations in Oxfordshire
DfT Category F2 stations
Former Great Western Railway stations
Railway stations in Great Britain opened in 1844
Railway stations in Great Britain closed in 1849
Railway stations in Great Britain opened in 1933
Railway stations served by Great Western Railway
1844 establishments in England